Tina Martin (born May 16, 1964) is an American college basketball coach. She is the interim head coach at UNC Wilmington. From 1996 to 2017, she was the head women's basketball coach at the University of Delaware. She helped make Delaware a women's basketball power, with eleven 20-win seasons including four regular-season CAA championships. Her teams also made four NCAA Tournament appearances, in addition to five WNIT appearances. She served as an assistant coach at Seton Hall University and at UNC Wilmington.

Early life and education
Born in Williamsport, Pennsylvania, Martin played college basketball at Lock Haven University of Pennsylvania from 1982 to 1986, earning two NCAA Division II All-American honors and scoring a Pennsylvania State Athletic Conference record 2,157 career points.

Coaching career
Martin began her coaching career as a graduate assistant at Lock Haven for the 1986–87 season before joining Phyllis Mangina's staff at Seton Hall as an assistant coach in 1987. At Seton Hall, Martin helped a losing program make back-to-back NCAA Tournament appearances in 1994 and 1995 NCAA Division I women's basketball tournament. The 1993–94 Seton Hall team went 27–5 and made the Sweet 16 round of the NCAA Tournament and remains the most successful team in program history.

On May 14, 1996, the University of Delaware hired Martin as head coach for Delaware Fightin' Blue Hens women's basketball. Martin went 408–238 in 21 seasons as head coach, with four NCAA Tournament appearances (2001, 2007, 2012, and 2013) and seven Women's National Invitation Tournament appearances (2002, 2003, 2005, 2006, 2010, 2011, and 2014). The 2012–13 Delaware team was the most successful in her tenure, as the team finished 32–4 with both CAA regular season and tournament titles and the program's first-ever appearance in the NCAA Sweet 16. Elena Delle Donne, leading scorer of that team, was the second overall pick in the 2013 WNBA draft.

Martin retired from Delaware on April 28, 2017.  In June 2017, Martin joined the staff at UNC Wilmington as an assistant coach and was made interim head coach in 2022.

Head coaching record
Source:

References

External links
Tina Martin biography at BlueHens.com

Delaware Fightin' Blue Hens women's basketball coaches
Seton Hall Pirates women's basketball coaches
Living people
1964 births
People from Williamsport, Pennsylvania
American women's basketball coaches
Basketball players from Pennsylvania
Lock Haven University of Pennsylvania alumni
UNC Wilmington Seahawks women's basketball coaches